Birgitte Bergman Sørensen (born 13 January 1967 in Helsingør) is a Danish politician, who is a member of the Folketing for the Conservative People's Party. She was elected into the Folketing in the 2019 Danish general election.

Political career
Bergman ran in the 2019 election, where she received 2,524 votes. This ensured her one of the Conservative People's Party's levelling seats.

External links 
 Biography on the website of the Danish Parliament (Folketinget)

References 

Living people
1967 births
People from Helsingør
21st-century Danish women politicians
Women members of the Folketing
Conservative People's Party (Denmark) politicians
Members of the Folketing 2019–2022